Kim & The Cadillacs (also spelled "Kim and The Cadillacs") were an Italian rock band, mainly active in the late seventies and in the early eighties.

Career 
The group formed in 1977 in Milan and was founded by three former members of a disbanded group called The Renegades – Kim Brown, Graham Johnson and Mick Webley – and Trutz Groth. The band adopted a 1950s-styled classic rock'n'roll repertoire, inspired by the 1950s nostalgia craze that had already informed similar groups in North America as well as films like American Graffiti and Grease and TV shows like Happy Days in the 1970s. 

After scoring a hit with "Rock and Roll Medley", in 1979, Kim & The Cadillacs entered the main competition at the Sanremo Music Festival with the song "C'era un'atmosfera" (written by Aldo Stellita and Piero Cassano from Matia Bazar), finishing eight. 

Their main successes were the 1979/80 single "Stop", the 1981 single "Non Stop Twist" and the 1984 album Size 50, which respectively charted fifteenth, thirteenth and seventh on the Italian hit parade. The latter benefitted from the band's media exposure as regular musical guests in the comedy show Drive In. The band split in 1988 and Kim Brown moved to Finland.

Personnel 
     Kim Brown -   voice, bass guitar
     Mick Webley -  voice, lead guitar
     Trutz "Viking" Groth -  voice, guitar, harmonica 
     Graham Johnson - drums, bongos   
     Ettore Vigo - electric piano
     Charles Stuart -  voice
     Tito Branca -  saxophone
     Attilio Brianzi -  saxophone
     Franco "Dede" Lo Previte - drums

Discography 
Albums 
     1977: Rock'N'Roll   
     1978: Kim & The Cadillacs  
     1978: On The Rocks   
     1979: Rock 'N' Rollers  
     1980: Rock Bottom    
     1981: Cadillac's Corn    
     1982: Boogie   
     1982: Cadillacs' Eldorado Dance   
     1984: Size 50   
     1985: On The Rocks   
     1986: 1986

References

External links
 

Musical groups established in 1977
Italian rock music groups
1977 establishments in Italy
Musical groups disestablished in 1986
Musical groups from Milan